Merle Viirmaa (born 15 June 1974) is a retired Estonian biathlete. She competed in the women's relay event at the 1994 Winter Olympics.

References

External links
 

1974 births
Living people
Biathletes at the 1994 Winter Olympics
Estonian female biathletes
Olympic biathletes of Estonia
Sportspeople from Tallinn